NAVO may refer to:

Naval Oceanographic Office
Arbeidsgiverforeningen NAVO
Navo, Texas, a small unincorporated community in Denton County, Texas, USA
North Atlantic Treaty Organization (NATO).
in Dutch: Noord-Atlantische Verdragsorganisatie